Two ships of the Royal Navy have borne the name HMS Laforey, after Admiral Sir Francis Laforey:

  was a  destroyer.  She was previously named HMS Florizel, but was renamed before being launched in 1913.  She was sunk by a mine in 1917.
  was an L-class destroyer, launched in 1941 and sunk in 1944.

Royal Navy ship names